Isaac Gompertz (1774 – 25 February 1856) was an early English Jewish poet, who was compared by his contemporaries, including Alexander Jamieson, to Dryden, Pope, Addison and Gray. He was known for the poems "The Modern Antique", "Time, or Light and Shade" and "Devon"; his works received positive attention from Leigh Hunt and were well received by the contemporary press.

Biography 
Gompertz was born in Middlesex in 1774. He was the brother of the early animal rights activist Lewis Gompertz and the mathematician and actuary Benjamin Gompertz. Gompertz composed epitaphs for his brother Barent and his brother Lewis' wife. He married Charlotte Florence Wattier (born 1799) on 3 December 1818; they had 3 children.

Gompertz died at his home in on Ebury Street, London, on 25 February 1856, at the age of 83. He was buried in Exeter Jewish Cemetery.

Publications 
 The Modern Antique; Or, The Muse in the Costume of Queen Anne (1813)
 Time, or Light and Shade (1815)
 Devon, a poem (1825)

References

External links 
 

1774 births
1856 deaths
19th-century English male writers
Burials in Devon
English Jewish writers
English people of German-Jewish descent
Isaac Gompertz
Jewish poets
People from Middlesex (before 1889)
19th-century English poets